Flight 827 may refer to

Air Rhodesia Flight 827, shot down on 12 February 1979
Airborne Express Flight 827, crashed on 22 December 1996

0827